Zotov (Russian, Ukrainian: Зо́тов) or Zotova (Зо́това; feminine) is a Russian and Ukrainian surname derived from the old Russian word zod — sculpting clay that may refer to:

 Aleksandr Zotov (born 1990), Russian footballer
 Anatoly Zotov, naval attaché to the Soviet Embassy in London
 Georgi Zotov (born 1990), Russian footballer
 Nikita Zotov (1644–1717), childhood tutor of Russian Tsar Peter the Great
 Oleksandr Zotov (born 1975), Ukrainian footballer
 Victor Zotov (1908–1977), New Zealand botanist
 Vladimir Zotov (1821–1896), writer

See also
 

Russian-language surnames
Ukrainian-language surnames